Mia Electric was a French electric car manufacturer in the 2010s. The company, based in Cerizay, France, designed and built electric vehicles made totally in France.

The Mia was the company's first all-electric model on the market.

Production began in June 2011 and sales to the public started in 2012. Production stopped in December 2013 due to financial problems. The Tribunal de Commerce de Niort placed the company in judicial liquidation in March 2014.

Specifications and models

Mia electric is offered in three trims: 
 Mia,
 Mia L, 
 Mia U (formerly Mia K)

The battery pack has a 3-year warranty period. Maximum range figures are based on the NEDC test procedures and may be less in cold weather or if the vehicle is loaded. All models have a top speed of 

All three models comply with the European safety standards for passenger vehicles, and therefore are considered highway-capable. In addition to a central airbag for the driver and seats with three-point safety belts, the standard equipment for the Mia includes an Anti-lock braking system (ABS) and emergency brake assist (EBA).

Production and sales
Mia Electric was formed from Heuliez and with private investment and the French Government totalling €30 million and took on the development of the Heuliez Friendly which had been initially unveiled in 2008.

The construction plant, which was entirely re-equipped in 2010, conformed to the most demanding aspects of current legislation with Certification to ISO 9001 and 14001 standards. Mia electric had its own design studio and 16 designers worked with the R&D department of no less than 80 engineers.

The Mia pre-production version was introduced at the March 2011 Geneva Motor Show. The production version was showcased at the September 2011 Frankfurt Motor Show.

The Mia range was sold through a distribution network which specialised in electric mobility in France and internationally, including Germany, Belgium, Netherlands, United Kingdom, Luxembourg, Norway, Czech Republic, Canada, Italy, Switzerland, Ile de la Réunion, New Caledonia, South Africa. Mia electric had as its target to achieve global availability of the Mia brand with strategic partnerships around the world. Production began in June 2011 and sales were limited to fleet customers in France and Germany. Retail sales to the general public started in 2012. A total of 660 passenger cars and 123 units of the Mia U box van were sold in Europe through October 2012. France was the leading market with 843 units registered since 2011 through January 2014.

Production stopped in December 2013 due to financial problems. The company was put under receivership in February 2014. The Tribunal de Commerce de Niort placed the company in judicial liquidation in March 2014.

Fox E-Mobility MIA 2.0

In 2020, the Mia electric minivan was updated by Fox Automotive Switzerland AG, as the Fox E-Mobility MIA 2.0, with the company expecting the vehicle to be on sale in Europe around 2023.

See also
 Electric car use by country
 Government incentives for plug-in electric vehicles
 List of modern production plug-in electric vehicles
 List of production battery electric vehicles

References

Production electric cars
Electric city cars